Brunellia pauciflora is a species of plant in the Brunelliaceae family. It is endemic to Ecuador.  Its natural habitat is subtropical or tropical moist montane forests. It is threatened by habitat loss. 
The specific epithet pauciflora is Latin for 'few-flowered'.

References

Flora of Ecuador
pauciflora
Endangered plants
Taxonomy articles created by Polbot